Patrol 36 was a neo-Nazi skinhead organization in Israel, consisting of 9 members, led by Eli Bonite (born Erik Bunyatov in 1988), alias "Ely the Nazi" ( Eli ha-Natsi,  Natsist Eli). The group's members were  Russian immigrants that had Jewish roots aged 16 to 21. According to The Daily Telegraph, the men's families were allowed to settle in Israel under the Law of Return.

Activities 
Patrol 36 was active between 2005 and September 2007. The group desecrated buildings, especially synagogues, with swastikas and graffiti, and carried out attacks on migrant workers from Africa and Asia, drug addicts, members of the LGBT+ community, and Haredi Jews. Patrol 36's members reportedly had tattoos with the number 88 (a reference to the phrase "Heil Hitler"), and were stockpiling guns, TNT, knives and portraits of Adolf Hitler. The group produced videos of their own attacks, which were found on computers seized by police.

In the homes of those arrested, police also found links to neo-Nazi websites, neo-Nazi films, and photos of members in Nazi uniforms. The group planned to celebrate the birthday of Adolf Hitler in front of Yad Vashem, a Holocaust memorial site. According to police, Patrol 36 maintained connections with neo-Nazi organisations in other countries.

One of the group's members, Ivan Kuzmin, said that "[In Ukraine] they called me things like dirty Jew... and here they called me stinky Russian". Kuzmin's grandmother was a Holocaust survivor. He said that the racism he experienced turned him into a racist.

Bonite was once recorded telling a gang member "my grandfather was a half-Jewboy. I will not have children so that this trash will not be born with even a tiny per cent of Jewboy blood." The cell was based in Petah Tikva, near Tel Aviv, where they all lived.

Arrest 
Israeli Police began investigating the group in 2006, after two incidents of Neo-Nazi graffiti in Petah Tikva. On 9 September 2007, eight of the group's members were arrested, while one of the group's members fled the country. Police also seized computers depicting videos of their attacks that they had filmed, Neo-Nazi related materials, such as swastika posters and Neo-Nazi films, along with explosives and an improvised pistol.

They were charged with conspiracy to commit a crime, assault, racial incitement, and distribution of racist materials, and tried in the Tel Aviv District Court. All group's members were found guilty, and received sentences ranging between one and seven years in prison. While reading the verdict, Judge Tsvi Gurfinkel said that he was imposing severe penalties to deter anyone else from following their example. Erik Bonite received a seven-year prison term. In January 2011, Dmitri Bogotich, the last suspected group member, was extradited to Israel from Kyrgyzstan.

Reaction 
Coverage of the group was widespread in Israel, and the uncovering of the organisation lead to a strong reaction in Israeli society. Major news channels and newspapers comprehensively covered the story, in a manner that was considered reflective of a wider, disproportionate moral panic.

Their discovery led to renewed consideration amongst politicians to amend the Law of Return. Effi Eitam of the National Religious Party and the National Union, which represent the religious Zionist movement and have previously attempted to advance bills to amend the Law of Return, stated that Israel has become "a haven for people who hate Israel, hate Jews, and exploit the Law of Return to act on this hatred".

While issuing his verdict, Judge Tsvi Gurfinkel stated, "the fact that they are Jews from the ex-Soviet Union and that they had sympathised with individuals who believed in racist theories is terrible". The BBC reported that the news of the attacks and of the men's arrests in 2007 "shocked the nation", as Israel was founded in the wake of the Holocaust. One of the members who was arrested and sentenced was the grandson of a Holocaust survivor.

The Anti-Defamation League condemned Patrol 36, characterized the group as marginal, and urged Israeli citizens to not stigmatize the community of Russian Jews in Israel in reaction to the incident.

See also 
 Racism in Israel
 Auto-antisemitism

References 

Ageism
Anti-Asian sentiment
Anti-black racism in Israel
Antisemitism in Israel
Crime in Israel
Neo-Nazi organizations
Neo-Nazism in Asia
Petah Tikva
Racism in Israel
Religious discrimination in Israel
Russian diaspora in Israel
Violence against LGBT people in Asia
Neo-Nazis of Jewish descent